Tom Young (born 26 April 1992) is an Australian rules footballer who played for the Collingwood Football Club and the  in the Australian Football League.

Young originally played for the Wollondilly Junior Football Club, near Bowral in New South Wales.  He then played football in Campbelltown and then for the Sydney University Australian National Football Club. In 2009, he represented NSW/ACT Rams at the AFL Under 18 Championships and also won the Sydney AFL Rising Star award whilst playing for Sydney Uni. In 2007 he was a recipient of a NSW AFL Scholarship from Collingwood, after being previously courted by other AFL clubs. He was named as Collingwood's best player in the reserves team in the Victorian Football League (VFL) in 2010, and was elevated to their senior list with the 104th selection in the 2010 AFL Draft.

Young made his AFL debut in Round 22, 2011 where he played the Brisbane Lions at the MCG.

Tom Young was traded to the Western Bulldogs during the 2012 trade period. Collingwood received pick 71 as their NSW scholarship player left after playing 9 games.

Young was delisted at the conclusion of the 2014 AFL season.

References

External links

1992 births
Living people
Collingwood Football Club players
Australian rules footballers from New South Wales
Western Bulldogs players
NSW/ACT Rams players
Sydney University Australian National Football Club players
Williamstown Football Club players